Lakki, population 1990, also known by its former name Portolago (Πόρτο Λάγο), is a community on the Greek island of Leros, in the Dodecanese, at the head of Lakki Bay.

The area was built up as the main base of the Italian Royal Navy in the Dodecanese starting in 1923. The town of Portolago was founded in the 1930s, under Italian rule, as a new model town, most of whose inhabitants were from the Italian military. After Leros was transferred to Greece in 1947, it was renamed Lakki.

History
Like the rest of the Dodecanese, Leros was ruled by Italy from 1912-1943. The Italian authorities founded the town of Portolago in the 1930s as a new model town, named after Mario Lago, the Governor of the Italian colony from 1922 to 1936. Mussolini was said to have a mansion for himself near town.

The buildings include:
 Casa del Balilla (House of the Fascist Youth) (1933), Bernabiti
 Covered market (1934–1936), Petracco
 Elementary school and creche (1934–1936), Petracco
 City Hall and Casa del Fascio (Fascist Party headquarters) (1935–1938), Bernabiti
 Cinema/Theater (1936–1938), Bernabiti
 Church of Saint Francis (now of Saint Nicholas) (1935–1939), Bernabiti

Naval base
Portolago was built up as the main base of the Italian Royal Navy in the Dodecanese starting in 1923, as the harbor of Rhodes was too small. The bay is deep, and about 3.5 km long and over 1 km wide, making it a suitable location for a naval base, in fact one of the best in the eastern Mediterranean. Under Italian rule, Portolago Bay (as it was then called) was heavily fortified. There was a double boom across the narrow entrance, and several batteries of guns covering it.

The naval base included multiple buildings and naval installations. There was no air strip, but there was a seaplane ramp. The island garrison included about 6500 men. It was the home port for two destroyers, two small torpedo boats, and four submarines.

External links
 Photos of the Fascist architecture of Portolago

Notes

Leros
Planned cities in Greece
Italian fascist architecture
Naval installations
Populated places in Kalymnos (regional unit)
Dodecanese under Italian rule